The following is a list of all IFT-licensed over-the-air television stations broadcasting in the Mexican state of Tlaxcala.

The only standalone stations licensed within Tlaxcala are the five transmitters in Tlaxcala Televisión, the state network of Tlaxcala, which broadcasts on virtual channel 10. Most television service in Tlaxcala is offered by repeaters of stations in Puebla and on Altzomoni, Estado de México.

List of television stations

|-

|-

|-

|-

|-

References

Television stations in Tlaxcala
Tlaxcala